The International Stakes is a Thoroughbred horse race run at Te Rapa Racecourse in Hamilton in early February every year. The 2010 running was sponsored by the connections of stallion Darci Brahma, after being sponsored for many years by Cambridge Stud and Whakanui Stud.  The race is now run as the Herbie Dyke Stakes.

In the early years the Waikato Racing Club invited jockeys from overseas to ride in the race, that being the reason for the name, and in 1972 Lester Piggott rode Sailing Home to victory in the race. At that time it was run every two years; it became an annual event from 1978.

In 2017 the purse was increased to $400,000, making it the richest Weight for Age race in New Zealand.

The race is one of two Group 1 weight-for-age events run on the same day, the other being the 1400m Waikato Sprint. A Group 2 three year old race, the David and Karyn Ellis Fillies Classic, is also on the same raceday.

Race results

See also

 Thoroughbred racing in New Zealand
 Zabeel Classic
 Bonecrusher New Zealand Stakes
 Otaki-Maori Weight for Age 
 Waikato Sprint

References

Horse races in New Zealand
Open middle distance horse races